Timothy Britten Parker (born February 8, 1962), also known as Toby Parker, is an American actor.

Background

Parker was born in Iowa City, Iowa and raised in Cincinnati, Ohio. He moved to New York City with his family in 1977 as he began pursuing his professional career. Toby is one of eight children. He has three brothers and four sisters, most of whom also have careers in the entertainment industry, including siblings Sarah Jessica Parker and Pippin Parker.

Professional career

In October 1976, Parker made his Broadway debut as an understudy at the Morosco Theatre in a revival of the play The Innocents, adapted and directed by Harold Pinter. 

In 1978, he was cast in Runaways, which made its Off-Broadway premiere at The Public Theater and later moved to Broadway at the Plymouth Theatre. He was in the original cast of The Visit at Criterion Center Stage Right in 1992, in which he played the roles of Ottilie Schill, Pedro Cabral, and Wechsler. 

In 1996, he joined Anthony Rapp, Adam Pascal, Daphne Rubin-Vega, Taye Diggs, Wilson Jermaine Heredia, and Idina Menzel in the Broadway cast of Rent. His roles included Gordon in "Life Support", the man in "Christmas Bells", Mr. Grey in "La Vie Boheme", and others. His voice can be heard on the original Broadway cast recording of Rent. He appeared with the rest of the cast to perform "Seasons of Love" and "La Vie Boheme" at the 1996 Tony Awards. Among the four awards the show won that evening was a Tony Award for Best Musical. The original cast has reunited to celebrate the show's 5th and 10th anniversaries in special one-night concerts. Parker joined the original cast at the Final Broadway Production of Rent, where the final cast and original cast sang an encore of "Seasons of Love".

Since 1991, Parker had a recurring role as a Forensics Technician on Law & Order with Rent co-star Jesse L. Martin. His film credits include Marshall Fine in Gold Coast; Bill in The Last Supper; and the M.C./King of Comedy in Joey Breaker.

Wicked (as Dr. Dillamond)
Parker originated the role of Doctor Dillamond on the First National US Tour of the musical Wicked, which began previews in Toronto on March 9, 2005 and opened March 31. He left the cast on March 5, 2006 to join the show's sit-down production in Chicago, replacing Steven Skybell on March 28, 2006. He left the Chicago cast on December 10, 2006. 

He originated the role of Doctor Dillamond in the Los Angeles sit-down production, which opened on February 21, 2007, following previews on February 10. He played his final performance on May 25, 2008. 

He reprised the role in the Broadway production, beginning performances on September 2, 2008, again replacing Skybell. 

On October 27, 2008, he appeared in "The Yellow Brick Road Not Taken", a one night only benefit performance celebrating the fifth anniversary of Wicked. 

He played Doctor Dillamond in early drafted scenes that were cut from the final version of the musical. After over two years in the Broadway company, making him the longest-running Broadway Dillamond to date, he played his final performance October 31, 2010. 

After a year away from the show and Doctor Dillamond, Parker returned to the role in the Second National US Tour company, marking his fourth North American production. He replaced Martin Moran on December 20, 2011, and he played his last show on September 30, 2012. From March 20 through April 14, 2013, he returned to the first touring production, where he created the role in 2005, covering in the absence of Clifton Davis.

On September 23, 2014, he returned to the show on Broadway, replacing K. Todd Freeman as Doctor Dillamond and played his final performance on January 31, 2016.

Naked Angels

Along with eleven other theater artists, including his brother Pippin Parker, Toby co-founded Naked Angels Theater Company in New York City in 1986.

References

External links
 Toby Parker Fansite

 Naked Angels Company Website

1962 births
American male film actors
American male musical theatre actors
Jewish American male actors
Living people
Place of birth missing (living people)
21st-century American male actors
20th-century American male actors
American male child actors
Male actors from Iowa
People from Iowa City, Iowa
Male actors from Cincinnati
American male television actors
21st-century American Jews